Ashton Historic District may refer to:

Ashton Historic District (Port Penn, Delaware), listed on the National Register of Historic Places (NRHP)
Ashton Historic District (Cumberland, Rhode Island), NRHP-listed
Old Ashton Historic District, Lincoln, Rhode Island, NRHP-listed